Ben Hoffman (born August 22, 1983) is an American professional triathlete from Grand Junction, Colorado who races in long distance, non-drafting triathlon events. In 2014 he placed second at the Ironman World Championship.

Career
Hoffman grew up in Grand Junction, Colorado where he participated in basketball, track, golf, and soccer in high school. He also took part in week long bicycle tours and a partial cross-country ride with his parents. After high school he attended the University of Montana where he earned a degree in Spanish language with a minor in English. Hoffman discovered triathlon during a summer trip to Alaska during which he found a book about training and racing. As a result, during his first year at Montana, 2003—2004, he joined the university club triathlon team (that included Linsey Corbin) as well as Team Stampede in Missoula where he enjoyed the people associated with the team, the training the sport required, and the competitiveness. Despite having no swimming background he was able to move past that obstacle and compete in his first race, the 2004 Grizzly Triathlon, where he took second place. In 2005 he took time to travel to Argentina. While away he had missed the sport and upon returning he decided that he would get serious about competing in triathlon. In his final year at Montana, Hoffman won the individual 2006 collegiate national championship and his club team won the overall Collegiate Triathlon National Championship.

Following graduation, Hoffman raced in triathlons in the Pacific Northwest and Canada while supporting himself just enough through race winnings that summer. He capped his summer racing off by traveling to Europe and competing in the 2006 World University Championships in Lausanne where he placed 39th. He committed to racing as a professional after that summer and moved to Durango, Colorado to train. There he worked part-time at the local health department doing Spanish translations and living paycheck to paycheck while training. His first race as a pro athlete came at the Wildflower Triathlon in 2007 where he took 3rd place. After a few years of part-time work at the health department he stopped working to become a full-time pro triathlete. In 2011 he moved his training base to Boulder, Colorado.

Hoffman has focused primarily on racing half-iron and ironman distance racing (e.g. Ironman 70.3 and Ironman Triathlon). He has won six Ironman events (Ironman Lake Placid, St. George, Wisconsin, Coeur d'Alene, and twice at Ironman South Africa) as well as numerous half iron-distance races. At the 2014 Ironman World Championship he had a break-through performance where he took 2nd place, five minutes back of winner Sebastian Kienle. His previous four finishes at the championship were 102nd, 53rd, DNF, and 15th.

Notable results
Hoffman's notable race results include:

References

External links

1983 births
Living people
American male triathletes
People from Grand Junction, Colorado
University of Montana alumni